The Salt Fork is a tributary of the Vermilion River located in the Central Corn Belt Plains of Illinois.

The Salt Fork owes its name to saline springs that provided natural salt licks for animals, and which were used for production of salt by Native Americans and early settlers. The springs were located about eight miles west of Danville, to the south of Muncie, Illinois. The upper reaches of the Salt Fork do not contain saline springs.

In its natural state, the Salt Fork drained a vast upland marsh between Urbana and Rantoul. The Salt Fork has been extended into these marshes by drainage ditches.

Parks and access points
 Crystal Lake Park, Urbana Park District
Homer Lake Park, Champaign County Forest Preserve District

Cities and towns
The following cities, towns and villages are in the Salt Fork watershed:

Champaign
Homer
Rantoul
Sidney
St. Joseph
Thomasboro
Urbana

Counties
The following counties are in the Salt Fork watershed:
Champaign County, Illinois
Vermilion County, Illinois

References

External links
Prairie Rivers Network
USGS Streamgage, Salt Fork near St. Joseph 

Rivers of Illinois
Tributaries of the Wabash River
Rivers of Champaign County, Illinois